Rare Earth was an American rock band from Detroit, Michigan. According to Louder, "Rare Earth's music straddles genres and defies categorisation, slipping seamlessly between the two seemingly disparate worlds of classic rock and R&B." The band was signed to Motown's subsidiary label Rare Earth. Although not the first white band signed to Motown, Rare Earth was the first successful act signed by Motown that consisted only of white members. (None of the previously signed all-white acts, the Rustix, the Dalton Boys or the Underdogs, had any hits.)

History

1960s
The group formed in 1960 as the Sunliners and changed its name to Rare Earth in 1968. The band felt the name "Rare Earth" was more in keeping with the names other bands were adopting, such as Iron Butterfly, more "with it."

After recording an unsuccessful debut album, Dream/Answers, on the Verve label in 1968, the group was signed to Motown in 1969. The band was one of the first acts signed to a new Motown imprint that would be dedicated to white rock acts. The record company did not have a name for the new label yet and the band jokingly suggested Motown call the label "Rare Earth". To the band's surprise, Motown decided to do just that.

The main personnel in the group were Gil Bridges, saxophone, flute, vocals; Peter Hoorelbeke (aka Peter Rivera), lead vocals, drums; John Parrish (aka John Persh), bass guitar, trombone, vocals; Rod Richards (born Rod Cox), guitar, vocals; and Kenny James (born Ken Folcik), keyboards. The group's recording style was hard-driving.

In late 1969, Edward "Eddie" Guzman (congas and assorted percussive instruments) was added to the group.

During 1969, the group contributed music to the film Generation that starred David Janssen and Kim Darby. An accompanying soundtrack album was released, but quickly withdrawn after the film failed commercially, with only a small number of copies sold. Several tracks were remixed and included on the next LP, Ecology, in 1970. The soundtrack album was reissued as a limited edition LP for Record Store Day 2020. The issue was pressed on hot pink vinyl and limited to a run of 2,000 copies.

1970s
Rare Earth had a number of top 40 hits in 1970–71, including remakes of the Temptations' "(I Know) I'm Losing You" and "Get Ready". Each was more successful than the Temptations original, with "Get Ready" being their biggest hit, peaking at number 4 on the US Billboard Hot 100 chart. This disc sold over one million copies and received a gold record awarded by the Recording Industry Association of America.
The group gained a bit of notoriety when it was mentioned dismissively in Gil Scott-Heron's 1970 poem, "The Revolution Will Not Be Televised", which included the line, "The theme song [to the revolution] will not be written by Jim Webb, Francis Scott Key, nor sung by Glen Campbell, Tom Jones, Johnny Cash, Engelbert Humperdinck, or the Rare Earth."

In 1971 Richards left due to musical differences, and James, weary of the group's increased touring schedule, also departed. Ray Monette (guitar) and Mark Olson (keyboards, vocals) joined to replace them.

The group's hits from late 1970 to early 1972 were "Born to Wander" (number 17), "I Just Want to Celebrate" (number 7), and "Hey, Big Brother" (number 19). There were no significant hits thereafter. Nevertheless, the band continued to record into the 1990s.

By 1972, Motown had decided to relocate from Detroit to Los Angeles and Rare Earth soon followed suit. Persh, however, decided not to make the move and was succeeded in the band by Mike Urso (Persh later died from a hospital staphylococcal infection on January 27, 1981). NBC reported that, at about this time, the police found "reputed mob enforcer" Joe Ulloa started financing the band, which seems to have resulted in the band members being eventually harassed by "strangers" several years later asking if they were hiding money.

Their 1973 album, Ma, written and produced by Norman Whitfield, is considered one of their best overall works, and features their version of "Hum Along and Dance". But the record did not sell well, and produced no hits.

Rare Earth was the opening act at California Jam festival in Ontario, California on April 6, 1974. The festival attracted over 250,000 people, and the band appeared alongside 1970s rock groups Black Sabbath; Emerson, Lake & Palmer; Deep Purple; Earth, Wind & Fire; Seals and Crofts; Black Oak Arkansas and Eagles. Portions of the show were broadcast on ABC Television in the U.S., exposing the band to a wider audience.

In 1974 the group began working with Motown producer Frank Wilson on their next project. But in his autobiography, "Born to Wander", Hoorelbeke described his having objections when Wilson okayed a song contributed by Olson without running it by the others first. Hoorelbeke thought the song was not up to the band's usual standards and Wilson ended up being taken off the project. The Frank Wilson sessions, which would have been the follow up to Ma, were mainly completed but remained in the vaults of Motown. A proposed double live record, recorded in 1974, and another live set, Live in Chicago, were also shelved.

In July 1974, the group divided. Mike Urso left the group along with Hoorelbeke and they formed a new band, HUB, with Rare Earth's 1970–1972 co-producer, Tom Baird, using the initials of their surnames (Hoorelbeke, Urso and Baird). HUB went on to record two albums for Capitol Records (HUB and Cheata) but came to a sudden end in November 1975 after Baird was killed in a boating accident.
 
The others (minus Olson, who left to join the backup band for Jennifer Warnes) decided to continue as Rare Earth and brought in new players: Jerry LaCroix (vocals, sax, harmonica, formerly of the Boogie Kings, Edgar Winter's White Trash and Blood, Sweat & Tears), Paul Warren (guitar, backing vocals), Bartholomew ("Frosty") Eugene Smith-Frost (formerly with Sweathog and Lee Michaels, drums), Reggie McBride (ex-Stevie Wonder, bass) and Gabriel Katona (keyboards).

The new lineup recorded Back to Earth in 1975 and went back on the road. However, both Paul Warren and Frosty left during this tour and new drummer Chet McCracken (who would go on to join the Doobie Brothers) was hired to finish out their 1975 tour. The band then recorded Midnight Lady (minus Katona and McCracken), which was released in 1976. Frank Westbrook replaced Katona on keyboards, whilst McCracken was not replaced, instead session musician Ollie Brown handled percussion duties for Midnight Lady. But neither of these releases sold as well as the band had been used to and they soon found themselves bogged down and unable to tour when they brought a lawsuit against former member Hoorelbeke, falsely claiming that he'd tried to make off with the group's name and retirement monies. The lawsuit was eventually settled in Hoorelbeke's favor and he was given a settlement.

In late 1976, a former Motown vice president, Barney Ales, an earlier champion of Rare Earth, returned to the company to head up one of their new offshoot labels, Prodigal Records. He made an offer to reunite the 1972–74 members of the band; Bridges, Guzman, Hoorelbeke, Urso, Olson and Monette to record a new album on Prodigal. However, Monette and Olson did not agree to the terms and abstained. Session players Dan Ferguson (guitar) and Ron Fransen (keyboards) were brought in instead to play on Rarearth, which was produced by both James Anthony Carmichael and Cal Harris (both of which later had success with the Commodores and Lionel Richie). It was released in 1977 but failed to reach expectations.

Later in 1977, the group reassembled with Chicago-based producer John Ryan (who worked with Styx and others) to begin work on two new albums. This time, Monette and Olson agreed to join in and the results were Band Together and Grand Slam, both released in 1978 and featuring more of a late 1970s disco sound, with the former providing the Bee Gees-penned hit "Warm Ride", which peaked at number 39. Other than the one solitary hit, neither album was a big seller. Gap Band bassist Robert Wilson contributed to some of the tracks on Band Together.

In June 1979 Urso left the band again. On his recommendation, and after hearing several bass players, the group recruited bassist Ken Johnston, who joined the group's road tours for two years until June 1981. Johnston had just completed a stint with jazz singer Maxine Weldon and had rejoined Las Vegas comedian/songster Kenny Laursen. He interrupted his tour with Laursen to join Rare Earth in Florida.

1980s and 1990s

Former Motown writer Dino Fekaris, who had penned the band's hits "I Just Want to Celebrate" and "Hey Big Brother", was next to step back into the group's life in 1980. He had just come off back to back successes with Gloria Gaynor and Peaches & Herb and had won a Grammy Award for Gaynor's hit "I Will Survive". RCA expressed interest in the band's new project and gave them an advance to go ahead and start recording. The project was originally to be titled King of the Mountain, with the title track slated to be the theme of a 1981 movie of the same name that starred Harry Hamlin. But the movie people passed on the song, and when the record was done, RCA was not happy with Fekaris' production, so they passed as well. This album, retitled Tight & Hot, saw a very limited release in 1982 in Canada only.

By the summer of 1981, Mike Urso had returned to Rare Earth after a two-year absence, but he left again in mid-1983, and has not returned to the band since then. Tim Ellsworth was then brought in as new bassist/vocalist in September 1983. By the tail end of that year, Peter Hoorelbeke was let go from the band again after disagreements with Gil Bridges. (Hoorelbeke went on to form the Classic Rock All-Stars in 1992.) Drummer Tony Thomas replaced Hoorelbeke on drums. After Hoorelbeke's departure, Ellsworth and Olson took over lead vocals. By that time most of the members of the band had moved back to Detroit, and the group continued to tour.

Personnel shuffles abounded in the mid-1980s. In September 1984, Bob Weaver took over the drum throne and played with the group into 1985. He was temporarily succeeded by Bob Brock, whose professional name was Bobby Rock (not Bob Rock, the famous Hard rock/Heavy metal producer from Canada), but returned only to be replaced by Jerry LeBloch in mid-1985. Also in September of '84, Andy Merrild replaced Tim Ellsworth as bassist until the end of June 1985. Ellsworth then returned and toured with the group until the end of August of '85. The group's road manager, Randy "Bird" Burghdoff, took over as Rare Earth's bassist in September 1985 and has remained in that position ever since. Mark Olson was let go in 1986 after increasing personal and substance abuse troubles. (Olson died on April 14, 1991, at the age of 41, from liver disease.) Rick Warner was then brought in as the band's new keyboardist and Wayne Baraks, who was recruited  in 1987 on rhythm guitar, took over much of the lead vocals as well.

In the late 1980s and early 1990s the personnel changes slowed down somewhat as things stabilized and the band found itself in demand to play on "oldies" bills with other acts of the 1960s and 1970s.

Drummer Dean Boucher replaced LeBloch on drums in 1989 and RE signed with the small foreign label Koch International and began work on a new album. The result was Different World (released in February 1993) which was a collection containing a few covers of older songs and new material. It was mostly overlooked by the public and not even issued in the U.S.

On July 29, 1993, the band suffered the loss of another member when long time percussionist Eddie Guzman (age 49) died at his home in Howell, Michigan.

The group kept going, though, and brought in new drummer Floyd Stokes Jr., who also took over for the departing Boucher, and took on lead vocal duties too after guitarist Baraks pulled out of the group in 1994.

Other than Mike Bruner's succeeding Rick Warner in January 1998 and Ivan Greilich's filling in for Ray Monette for five years (2004–2009), the lineup was stable overall until Monette's final departure in 2017.

Rare Earth continued to perform at corporate events on the oldies circuit. Bits from their recordings have been used as samples on recordings as diverse as Beck's "Derelict", UNKLE, and DJ Shadow's "GDMFSOB (feat. Roots Manuva - U.N.K.L.E. uncensored version)", Black Sheep's "Try Counting Sheep", Peanut Butter Wolf's "Tale of Five Cities", Scarface's "Faith", NWA's "Real Niggaz Don't Die" and Eric B. and Rakim's "What's Going On".

2000 and beyond
Their hit "I Just Want to Celebrate" has been used in US-wide advertising campaigns by Ford Motor Company, AT&T Corporation, and Nicoderm.

In 2005 Rare Earth was voted into the Michigan Rock and Roll Legends Hall of Fame.

The album A Brand New World was released on CD in 2008 on Rare Earth Music.

In March 2017 long time guitarist Ray Monette announced his retirement from the band due to recurring back troubles. His replacement was Jerry "Lew" Patterson.

Rare Earth continued playing events such as Disneys Anniversary- Hippie Fest, The Moody Blues Cruises and Classic Rock Festivals.

Gil Bridges, the last original member appearing in the current Rare Earth lineup, died from complications arising from COVID-19 on December 8, 2021, aged 80.

Members

Final members 
Gil Bridges – saxophone, flute, lead vocals (1968–2021; died 2021)
Mike Bruner – keyboards (1998–2021)

Former members 

Ray Monette – lead guitars, vocals (1971–1976, 1977–2004, 2009–2017)
Peter Hoorelbeke (a.k.a. Peter Rivera) – drums, lead vocals (1968–1974, 1976–1983)
Randy "Bird" Burghdoff – bass, vocals (1985–2021)
Floyd Stokes Jr. – drums, lead vocals (1993–2021)
Jerry Lew Patterson - lead guitar (2021)
John Persh (a.k.a. John Parrish) – bass, trombone, vocals (1968–1972; died 1981)
Rod Richards (born Rod Cox) – lead guitars, vocals (1968–1971)
Kenny James (born Ken Folcik) – keyboards (1968–1971)
Eddie Guzman – percussion (1969–1993; died 1993)
Mark Olson – keyboards, lead vocals (1971–1974, 1977–1986; died 1991)
Mike Urso – bass, vocals (1972–1974, 1976–1979, 1981–1983)
Jerry LaCroix – vocals, saxophone, harmonica (1974–1976; died 2014)
Reggie McBride – bass (1974–1976)
Gabriel Katona – keyboards (1974–1976)
Barry "Frosty" Frost – drums (1974–1975; died 2017)
Paul Warren – rhythm guitars, backing vocals (1974–1975)
Chet McCracken – drums (1975–1976)
Jimi Calhoun – bass (1976)
Frank Westbrook – keyboards (1976)
Ken Johnston – bass, vocals (1979–1981)
Tim Ellsworth – bass, lead vocals (1983–1984, 1985)
Tony Thomas – drums (1983–1984)
Bob Weaver – drums (1984–1985)
Andy Merrild – bass (1984–1985)
Bobby Rock – drums (1985)
Jerry LeBloch – drums (1985–1990)
Rick Warner – keyboards (1986–1998)
Wayne Baraks – rhythm guitars, lead vocals (1987–1994)
Dean Boucher – drums (1990–1993)
Ivan Greilich – lead guitars, vocals (2004–2009)

Discography

Studio albums

Live albums

Singles

Compilation albums
 1975 Masters of Rock
 1976 Disque d'Or
 1981 Motown Superstar Series, Vol. 16
 1984 Rare Earth & Grand Funk: Best of 2 Superstar Groups
 1988 Get Ready/Ecology (Double CD)
 1991 Greatest Hits & Rare Classics
 1994 Earth Tones: Essential
 1995 Anthology: The Best of Rare Earth (2 CD & 2 Cassette Set)
 1995 Rare Earth featuring Peter Rivera
 1998 The Very Best of Rare Earth
 2001 20th Century Masters - The Millennium Collection: The Best of Rare Earth
 2004 The Collection
 2005 Get Ready and More Hits
 2006 Best of Rare Earth
 2008 Fill Your Head: The Studio Albums 1969-1974

References

External links
 
 
 
 
 [ Artist Biography - Rare Earth] at Billboard''

Psychedelic rock music groups from Michigan
American blues rock musical groups
Funk rock musical groups
American soul musical groups
Motown artists
Musical groups established in 1960
Musical groups established in 1968
Musical groups from Detroit
1960 establishments in Michigan